The Kanpur Memorial Church, originally known as the All Souls' Church, is a church located in Kanpur, India that belongs to the Church of North India, a united Protestant denomination. It was built in 1875 in honour of British valour during the Siege of Cawnpore in 1857.

Location
The church is situated on Albert Lane near Cawnpore Club in Kanpur Cantonment. It is situated in the heart of the cantonment.

Architecture

The church was designed by Walter Granville, architect of the East Bengal Railway. The complete church in Lombardic Gothic style is attractively executed in bright red brick with polychrome dressings. To the east of the church is the memorial garden which can only be approached through one gateway. It has a handsome carved Gothic screen designed by Henry Yule. Its centre is occupied by a beautiful carved figure of an angel by Baron Carlo Marochetti, with crossed arms, holding palons, i.e. symbols of peace. This carved figure was created in memory of the Bibighar massacre, where Indian rebels killed approximately 200 unarmed European women and children with guns and cleavers, throwing their remains into a nearby well and burying some survivors under the pile of bodies.

References 

Churches in Uttar Pradesh
Anglican church buildings in India
Religious buildings and structures in Kanpur
Churches completed in 1875
1875 establishments in India